Joseph Winston Kelly, Jr. (born December 11, 1964) is a former American football linebacker who played eleven seasons in the National Football League (NFL) for six different teams.  He played college football at the University of Washington under head coach Don James and was team's MVP as a senior in 1985. In his junior season in 1984, the Huskies finished second in the polls after upsetting Oklahoma in the Orange Bowl.

Kelly was the eleventh overall selection of the 1986 NFL Draft, taken by the Cincinnati Bengals. After four seasons with Cincinnati, he played three more with the New York Jets, then one each with the Los Angeles Raiders, Los Angeles Rams, Green Bay Packers, and Philadelphia Eagles.

See also
 Washington Huskies football statistical leaders

External links
 
 

1964 births
Living people
People from Sun Valley, Los Angeles
American football linebackers
Washington Huskies football players
Cincinnati Bengals players
New York Jets players
Los Angeles Raiders players
Los Angeles Rams players
Green Bay Packers players
Philadelphia Eagles players
People from Loveland, Ohio
Players of American football from Los Angeles
Sportspeople from the Cincinnati metropolitan area
Players of American football from Ohio
Jefferson High School (Los Angeles) alumni